Gibb Droll is an American guitarist known for his blues-infused rock. He is the founder of the Gibb Droll Band, but more recently has played with the group Keller Williams with Moseley, Droll and Sipe (formerly the WMDs). He is currently a member of Bruce Hornsby's backing band, the Noisemakers. He has appeared on Jay Leno, Conan O'Brien, The CBS Morning Show, A&E, MTV, VH1, and CMT.  His albums have sold over 50,000 records independently, been acknowledged in Billboard Magazine and earned himself a spot in the Rolling Stone Reader's Top 20 Poll.

Early Years
Droll was raised in Virginia Beach, VA, where he was known as an avid skateboarder and guitarist at an early age.  Droll is a self-taught musician, recalling in an early nineties interview:

I haven't been schooled. My brother sold me a guitar when I was ten years old. . . . I think I'm really in love with these damn wooden instruments.

The original lineup of the Gibb Droll band consisted of Droll on guitar, Tom Hall on bass, and Mike Williams (aka Funk  Bubble) on drums.

Discography

Gibb Droll Band

Keller Williams with Moseley, Droll and Sipe
 12 (2007)

Compilations
 Aware Compilation, Vol. 3 (1995)

References

External links
Gibb Droll on [ All Music Guide]
Gibb Droll on MySpace
Official page for Keller Williams with Moseley Droll and Sipe
Welcome Ross Holmes and Gibb Droll

Living people
Year of birth missing (living people)
American rock guitarists
American male guitarists